The 2016 NCAA Division III football season, part of the college football season organized by the NCAA at the Division III level in the United States, began on September 5, 2016 and ended with the NCAA Division III Football Championship, also known as the Stagg Bowl, on December 16, 2016 at Salem Football Stadium in Salem, Virginia. However, UMHB's championship was later vacated by the NCAA.

Conference changes and new programs
Three programs changed conference affiliations.

A full list of Division III teams can be viewed on the D3football website.

This was also the final season of competition for two Division III conferences. The New England Football Conference will be absorbed by the Commonwealth Coast Conference, and the Southern Collegiate Athletic Conference, which had lost most of its membership in 2012 when seven schools left to form the Southern Athletic Association, will end its sponsorship of football and continue as a non-football conference.

Conference standings

Postseason
Twenty-five conferences met the requirements for an automatic ("Pool A") bid to the playoffs. Besides the NESCAC, which does not participate in the playoffs, two conferences had no Pool A bid. The American Southwest, which had fallen below the required seven members in 2013 and lost its Pool A bid after the two-year grace period, was in the first year of the two-year waiting period, having now attained seven members; the SCAC had only four members.

Schools not in Pool A conferences were eligible for Pool B. The number of Pool B bids was determined by calculating the ratio of Pool A conferences to schools in those conferences and applying that ratio to the number of Pool B schools. The 25 Pool A conferences contained 222 schools, an average of 8.9 teams per conference. Twelve schools were in Pool B, enough for one bid.

The remaining six playoff spots were at-large ("Pool C") teams.

Playoff bracket

* Home team   † Overtime    Winner

Bowl games
Winning teams are denoted in bold.

See also
2016 NCAA Division I FBS football season
2016 NCAA Division I FCS football season
2016 NCAA Division II football season
2016 NAIA football season

References